Sidi Mezghiche is a district in Skikda Province, Algeria. It is one of three districts in the province that do not lie on the Mediterranean Sea. It was named after its capital, Sidi Mezghiche.

Municipalities
The district is further divided into 3 municipalities:
Sidi Mezghiche
Aïn Bouziane
Béni Oulbane

Districts of Skikda Province